Nina Petri (born 16 July 1963) is a German actress. She has appeared in more than one hundred films since 1983.

Partial filmography

Television appearances

Awards
Bavarian Film Award (best actress) (1994)
Deutscher Filmpreis (best supporting actress) (1999)

References

External links

 

1963 births
Living people
Actresses from Hamburg
German film actresses
German television actresses
20th-century German actresses
21st-century German actresses